William Gibson (17 September 1926 – 21 January 1995) was a Scottish professional footballer who played as a right back in the Football League for Tranmere Rovers.

References

1926 births
1995 deaths
Footballers from Glasgow
Association football fullbacks
Scottish footballers
Arsenal F.C. players
Brentford F.C. players
Tranmere Rovers F.C. players
English Football League players